Edward Gibson Lanpher (born December 8, 1942 Richmond, Virginia)  was an American Career Foreign Service Officer who served as the Ambassador Extraordinary and Plenipotentiary to Zimbabwe (1991–1995).

Lanpher grew up in Alexandria, Virginia and attended the Burgundy Farm Country Day School which was the first racially integrated school in Virginia, Phillips Academy and Brown University.

References

External links
U.S. Calls for Apology From Zimbabwe

1942 births
Living people
Phillips Academy alumni
Brown University alumni
People from Alexandria, Virginia
Ambassadors of the United States to Zimbabwe
20th-century American diplomats